Snow is an American Christmas-themed film starring Tom Cavanagh and Ashley Williams that premiered in 2004 on the ABC television network, and was also shown on the Freeform (formerly ABC Family) cable network later the same year. It was written by Rich Burns and directed by Alex Zamm.

Since 2004, Snow has become a staple on Freeform's annual 25 Days of Christmas programming block.

Plot 
Nick Snowden, who is really the son of Santa Claus, falls for Sandy Brooks, a pretty zookeeper who works at The San Ernesto Zoo from which he must rescue Buddy, a young reindeer who has not yet learned to fly. He needs her help to get Buddy out, so he follows her home. Nick meets Lorna, the landlady and owner of the boarding house where Sandy stays. She thinks Nick is a tenant, gets to know him, and lets him stay in the boarding house. Nick meets Hector, whose mother, Isabel, is a postal worker. Hector figures out that Nick is Santa Claus. Nick meets Sandy and falls for her. Sandy falls for him too and is unaware that he is Santa Claus. She helps Nick get Buddy out of the zoo and back to the North Pole. Nick usually teleports himself in and out by mirror, but the only way the mirror works is by using North Pole snow. Buck Seger is a hunter who works at the zoo and has a crush on Sandy. He sees Nick as a rival and researches that Buddy is from the North Pole. He plans to sell Buddy to a big-game hunter. Nick, Sandy, Hector, and Isabel chase Buck all over town and rescue Buddy and send him back to the North Pole. On Christmas, Nick has left Sandy a china doll in her bedroom, and she goes back to The North Pole with him.

Cast
 Tom Cavanagh as Nick Snowden
 Ashley Williams as Sandy Brooks
 Patrick Fabian as Buck Seger

Other cast
Bobb'e J. Thompson as Hector
Jackie Burroughs as Lorna
Leslie "Les" Carlson as Chester
Karen Robinson as Isabel
Paul Bates as Carl
Adam Greydon Reid as Jordan
Dan Willmott as Passenger #1
Bubba as Security Guard #2
Zie Souwand as Boy on Tour Bus
Mark Breanne as Girl on Tour Bus
Andrea Scott as Female Co-worker
Michael Dunston as Man Dressed as Elf

Sequel
The sequel, Snow 2: Brain Freeze, was released on December 14, 2008 as part of ABC Family's 25 Days of Christmas. The main cast from the first film reprise their roles in the sequel.

See also
 List of Christmas films
 Santa Claus in film

External links 
 

American Christmas films
2004 television films
2004 films
ABC Family original films
Christmas television films
Films directed by Alex Zamm
2000s Christmas films